The 2013 Winston-Salem mayoral election was held on November 5, 2013 to elect the mayor of Winston-Salem, North Carolina. It saw the reelection of Allen Joines.

Democratic primary

General election 
While he kept his name on the ballot, Knox stopped actively campaigning in August when it became public knowledge that he had used a racial epithet to describe a county elections worker in 2012.

References 

Winston-Salem
Mayoral elections in Winston-Salem, North Carolina
Winston-Salem